The Colton Joint Unified School District (CJUSD) in San Bernardino County, California serves the communities of Colton, Bloomington, and Grand Terrace and small portions of Fontana, Rialto and San Bernardino. The District opened in 1872.

High schools
  Bloomington High School (opened in 1962)
 Colton High School (opened in 1895)
 Grand Terrace High School (opened in 2012)
 Slover Mountain High School (opened in 1970)
 Washington Alternative High School (opened in 1975)

Middle schools
Joe Baca Middle School 
 Colton Middle School
 Ruth O. Harris Middle School
 Terrace Hills Middle School

Elementary schools
 Alice Birney Elementary School
 Cooley Ranch Elementary School
 Crestmore Elementary School
 Michael D'Arcy Elementary School
 Grand Terrace Elementary School
 Ulysses S. Grant Elementary School
 Ruth Grimes Elementary School
 Jurupa Vista Elementary School
 Mary B. Lewis Elementary School
 Abraham Lincoln Elementary School
 William McKinley Elementary School
 Reche Canyon Elementary School
 Paul J. Rogers Elementary School
 San Salvador (Preschool/ Headstart)
 Gerard A. Smith Elementary School
 Sycamore Hills Elementary School
 Terrace View Elementary School
 Woodrow Wilson Elementary School
 Walter Zimmerman Elementary School

See also
 List of school districts in San Bernardino County
 List of school districts in California

External links
 Colton Joint Unified School District

School districts in San Bernardino County, California
School districts in Riverside County, California
Colton, California
Crestmore Heights, California
1872 establishments in California
School districts established in 1872